The Public Library Association (PLA) is a division of the American Library Association, is a professional association of public librarians and supporters dedicated to the "development and effectiveness of public library staff and public library services." In keeping with this mission, the PLA provides continuing education to members, hosts a biennial professional conference, publishes a trade journal, and advocates for public libraries and literacy. The PLA was founded in 1944 and currently has over 9,000 members.

Mission & Goals 
The mission of the Public Library Association is to enhance the development and effectiveness of public library staffers and public library services. This mission allows the PLA to:
 Focus its efforts on serving the needs of its members
 Address issues which affect public libraries
 Commit to quality public library services that benefit the general public
The goals of the PLA, as of 2014, now are:
 Advocacy and Awareness: PLA plays a major role in public library advocacy and in influencing public perception about the library.
 Leadership and Transformation: PLA is a leading source for learning opportunities to advance the transformation of public libraries and helps to position the library's institutional and professional orientation from internal to outward toward the community.
 Literate Nation: PLA is a leader and valued partner of public libraries’ initiatives to create a literate nation.
 Organizational Excellence: PLA is positioned to sustain and grow its resources to advance the work of the association.
These Mission & Goals come from the PLA Strategic Plan, approved by the PLA Board of Directors, June 2014.

Issues
The PLA identifies the following areas as "priority concerns":
 Adequate funding for public libraries
 Improved management of public libraries
 Recognition of the importance of all library staff members in providing quality public service
 Recruitment, education, training, and compensation of public librarians
 Intellectual freedom
 Improved access to library resources
 Effective communication with the nonlibrary world.

Governance
The PLA is governed by an 11-member Board of Directors elected by the association's members. The PLA Board of Directors consists of the President, President-Elect, Past-President, six Directors-at-Large, ALA Division Councilor, and PLA Executive Director. The Executive Director is an ex-officio and non-voting board member tasked with enacting the board's decisions. The PLA's current president is Carolyn Anthony, its president-elect is Larry Neal, and its executive director is Barbara Macikas.

Members of PLA standing committees, award juries, task forces, and advisory groups are appointed to one- or two-year terms by the president-elect. Active committees include a Budget and Finance Committee, Every Child Ready to Read Oversight Committee, Intellectual Freedom Committee, Leadership Development Committee, Legislation and Advocacy Committee, Public Libraries Advisory Committee, and committees to manage the PLA's biennial conferences and nominate candidates for committee service.

Publications
Public Libraries is the PLA's official trade magazine. Published six times annually, this magazine focuses on news and issues pertaining to public libraries and librarianship. It commenced publication in January 1947 under the editorship of Muriel E. Perry of Decatur Public Library. Public Libraries Online is the digital companion to the print journal and offers three full articles from each print issue, plus daily updates, interviews, blogging, and other exclusive content. The print magazine is a delayed open access journal; its web companion is free and open to all users. PLA is also responsible for the publication of many key monograph titles in the field of public librarianship.

History
PLA was formed in 1944 as the Division of Public Libraries of the American Library Association. The formation of the Division of Public Libraries of the American Library Association was approved by the ALA Council in 1944 following petitions signed by nearly 1,200 members. The first PLA president was Amy Winslow of Cuyahoga County Library. The first Executive Secretary (a position now known as Executive Director) was Julia Wright Merrill. The original mission of the division was to advance public library interests and to cooperate in the promotion of library service in general. In 1971 Effie Lee Morris became the first woman and black person to serve as president of the PLA. The PLA's First National Conference, with the theme "Serving People: Public Libraries Today and Tomorrow" was presented March 23–26, 1983 in Baltimore, Maryland. The conference chair was Charles W. Robinson. The core purposes was to strengthen public libraries and their contribution to the communities they serve.

See also
 American Library Association
 History of public library advocacy
 Library science
 Public libraries
 Public library advocacy
 Public Libraries

References

External links
Public Library Association
American Library Association
Public Libraries Online

Library associations in the United States
Library-related professional associations
Professional associations based in the United States
Non-profit organizations based in Chicago

Public libraries